The 2nd constituency of Ardèche is a French legislative constituency in the Ardèche département.

Deputies

Election results

2022

 
 
 
|-
| colspan="8" bgcolor="#E9E9E9"|
|-
 

 
 
 
 
 * Dussopt stood for PS at the previous election, but is standing for TdP as part of the Ensemble alliance having joined the Borne government as Minister of Labour in May 2022. For swing calculation purposes, Dussopt's result at the last election is counted with the NUPES alliance, which is endorsed by PS.

2017

2012

|- style="background-color:#E9E9E9;text-align:center;"
! colspan="2" rowspan="2" style="text-align:left;" | Candidate
! rowspan="2" colspan="2" style="text-align:left;" | Party
! colspan="2" | 1st round
! colspan="2" | 2nd round
|- style="background-color:#E9E9E9;text-align:center;"
! width="75" | Votes
! width="30" | %
! width="75" | Votes
! width="30" | %
|-
| style="background-color:" |
| style="text-align:left;" | Olivier Dussopt
| style="text-align:left;" | Socialist Party
| PS
| 
| 40.29%
| 
| 53.35%
|-
| style="background-color:" |
| style="text-align:left;" | Mathieu Darnaud
| style="text-align:left;" | Union for a Popular Movement
| UMP
| 
| 33.88%
| 
| 46.65%
|-
| style="background-color:" |
| style="text-align:left;" | Véronique Gathercole
| style="text-align:left;" | National Front
| FN
| 
| 13.50%
| colspan="2" style="text-align:left;" |
|-
| style="background-color:" |
| style="text-align:left;" | Myriam Normand
| style="text-align:left;" | Left Front
| FG
| 
| 4.22%
| colspan="2" style="text-align:left;" |
|-
| style="background-color:" |
| style="text-align:left;" | Justine Arnaud
| style="text-align:left;" | The Greens
| VEC
| 
| 3.40%
| colspan="2" style="text-align:left;" |
|-
| style="background-color:" |
| style="text-align:left;" | Claude Escande
| style="text-align:left;" | 
| CEN
| 
| 1.69%
| colspan="2" style="text-align:left;" |
|-
| style="background-color:" |
| style="text-align:left;" | Raphaël Nogier
| style="text-align:left;" | Miscellaneous Right
| DVD
| 
| 0.67%
| colspan="2" style="text-align:left;" |
|-
| style="background-color:" |
| style="text-align:left;" | Brigitte Tussau
| style="text-align:left;" | Ecologist
| ECO
| 
| 0.61%
| colspan="2" style="text-align:left;" |
|-
| style="background-color:" |
| style="text-align:left;" | Anne-Laure le Grand
| style="text-align:left;" | Miscellaneous Right
| DVD
| 
| 0.56%
| colspan="2" style="text-align:left;" |
|-
| style="background-color:" |
| style="text-align:left;" | Pascal Guion
| style="text-align:left;" | Far Left
| EXG
| 
| 0.48%
| colspan="2" style="text-align:left;" |
|-
| style="background-color:" |
| style="text-align:left;" | Jackie Durand
| style="text-align:left;" | Ecologist
| ECO
| 
| 0.37%
| colspan="2" style="text-align:left;" |
|-
| style="background-color:" |
| style="text-align:left;" | Christophe Marchisio
| style="text-align:left;" | Far Left
| EXG
| 
| 0.32%
| colspan="2" style="text-align:left;" |
|-
| style="background-color:" |
| style="text-align:left;" | Gabriel Bardonnet
| style="text-align:left;" | Other
| AUT
| 
| 0.00%
| colspan="2" style="text-align:left;" |
|-
| colspan="8" style="background-color:#E9E9E9;"|
|- style="font-weight:bold"
| colspan="4" style="text-align:left;" | Total
| 
| 100%
| 
| 100%
|-
| colspan="8" style="background-color:#E9E9E9;"|
|-
| colspan="4" style="text-align:left;" | Registered voters
| 
| style="background-color:#E9E9E9;"|
| 
| style="background-color:#E9E9E9;"|
|-
| colspan="4" style="text-align:left;" | Blank/Void ballots
| 
| 1.32%
| 
| 2.40%
|-
| colspan="4" style="text-align:left;" | Turnout
| 
| 62.59%
| 
| 61.30%
|-
| colspan="4" style="text-align:left;" | Abstentions
| 
| 37.41%
| 
| 38.70%
|-
| colspan="8" style="background-color:#E9E9E9;"|
|- style="font-weight:bold"
| colspan="6" style="text-align:left;" | Result
| colspan="2" style="background-color:" | PS HOLD
|}

2007

|- style="background-color:#E9E9E9;text-align:center;"
! colspan="2" rowspan="2" style="text-align:left;" | Candidate
! rowspan="2" colspan="2" style="text-align:left;" | Party
! colspan="2" | 1st round
! colspan="2" | 2nd round
|- style="background-color:#E9E9E9;text-align:center;"
! width="75" | Votes
! width="30" | %
! width="75" | Votes
! width="30" | %
|-
| style="background-color:" |
| style="text-align:left;" | Olivier Dussopt
| style="text-align:left;" | Socialist Party
| PS
| 
| 26.10%
| 
| 53.71%
|-
| style="background-color:" |
| style="text-align:left;" | Gérard Weber
| style="text-align:left;" | Union for a Popular Movement
| UMP
| 
| 29.37%
| 
| 46.29%
|-
| style="background-color:" |
| style="text-align:left;" | Jacques Dubay
| style="text-align:left;" | Miscellaneous Right
| DVD
| 
| 16.87%
| colspan="2" style="text-align:left;" |
|-
| style="background-color:" |
| style="text-align:left;" | Dominique Chambon
| style="text-align:left;" | Democratic Movement
| MoDem
| 
| 8.82%
| colspan="2" style="text-align:left;" |
|-
| style="background-color:" |
| style="text-align:left;" | Claude Richard
| style="text-align:left;" | National Front
| FN
| 
| 3.72%
| colspan="2" style="text-align:left;" |
|-
| style="background-color:" |
| style="text-align:left;" | Jean Fantini
| style="text-align:left;" | Communist
| COM
| 
| 3.51%
| colspan="2" style="text-align:left;" |
|-
| style="background-color:" |
| style="text-align:left;" | Jean-Claude Mourgues
| style="text-align:left;" | The Greens
| VEC
| 
| 3.42%
| colspan="2" style="text-align:left;" |
|-
| style="background-color:" |
| style="text-align:left;" | Odette Gorisse
| style="text-align:left;" | Far Left
| EXG
| 
| 2.51%
| colspan="2" style="text-align:left;" |
|-
| style="background-color:" |
| style="text-align:left;" | Véronique Faure
| style="text-align:left;" | Hunting, Fishing, Nature, Traditions
| CPNT
| 
| 1.40%
| colspan="2" style="text-align:left;" |
|-
| style="background-color:" |
| style="text-align:left;" | Brigitte Inglese
| style="text-align:left;" | Ecologist
| ECO
| 
| 1.18%
| colspan="2" style="text-align:left;" |
|-
| style="background-color:" |
| style="text-align:left;" | Christophe Frachon
| style="text-align:left;" | Movement for France
| MPF
| 
| 1.08%
| colspan="2" style="text-align:left;" |
|-
| style="background-color:" |
| style="text-align:left;" | Béatrice Cauvin
| style="text-align:left;" | Far Left
| EXG
| 
| 0.81%
| colspan="2" style="text-align:left;" |
|-
| style="background-color:" |
| style="text-align:left;" | Patrick Schoun
| style="text-align:left;" | Divers
| DIV
| 
| 0.63%
| colspan="2" style="text-align:left;" |
|-
| style="background-color:" |
| style="text-align:left;" | Michel Rouby
| style="text-align:left;" | Far Right
| EXD
| 
| 0.58%
| colspan="2" style="text-align:left;" |
|-
| colspan="8" style="background-color:#E9E9E9;"|
|- style="font-weight:bold"
| colspan="4" style="text-align:left;" | Total
| 
| 100%
| 
| 100%
|-
| colspan="8" style="background-color:#E9E9E9;"|
|-
| colspan="4" style="text-align:left;" | Registered voters
| 
| style="background-color:#E9E9E9;"|
| 
| style="background-color:#E9E9E9;"|
|-
| colspan="4" style="text-align:left;" | Blank/Void ballots
| 
| 1.86%
| 
| 3.07%
|-
| colspan="4" style="text-align:left;" | Turnout
| 
| 62.29%
| 
| 62.84%
|-
| colspan="4" style="text-align:left;" | Abstentions
| 
| 37.71%
| 
| 37.16%
|-
| colspan="8" style="background-color:#E9E9E9;"|
|- style="font-weight:bold"
| colspan="6" style="text-align:left;" | Result
| colspan="2" style="background-color:" | PS GAIN
|}

2002

 
 
 
 
 
 
 
|-
| colspan="8" bgcolor="#E9E9E9"|
|-

1997

References

2